Scythris alseriella is a moth of the family Scythrididae. It was described by Turati in 1879. It is found in Armenia, northern Italy and Switzerland.

References

alseriella
Moths described in 1879
Moths of Europe